Baragi may refer to:

 Baragi, Bagalkot, India
 Barağı, Keşan, Turkey